XHREC-FM is a radio station on 104.9 FM in Villahermosa, Tabasco, Mexico.

History
XEREC-AM 940 received its concession on April 25, 1991. By the 2000s, it had moved into Tabasco.

XEREC migrated to FM in 2010.

On April 1, 2021, Vida Romántica ceased airing on the frequency to make way for the Heraldo Radio news-talk network, which had briefly been heard on XHRVI-FM 106.3. On April 1, 2022, Heraldo Radio dropped eight stations, including XHREC, as affiliates, it became La Mexicana with a regional Mexican format.

References

Radio stations in Tabasco